"New Worlds" was the third story arc from Grant Morrison's run on the Marvel Comics title New X-Men, running from issues #127-133. In the aftermath of both the Genoshan genocide and Cassandra Nova's revelation of Charles Xavier's mutant powers, as well as his school's function as a mutant haven, the X-Men must try to broker peace amidst rising human/mutant tensions, while still combating the mutant threats arising worldwide. This story arc not only dealt with the fallout of Genosha's destruction, but also began the psychic relationship shared by Cyclops and Emma Frost.

Plot
In Mutant Town, New York City's growing mutant ghetto, a monster is on the loose. At least, that's the public sentiment. When Xorn investigates the incidents sparking rumors of a "mutant, dog eating killer," he finds twelve-year-old Sonny Bean, in the midst of his adolescent mutation. Grown to a behemoth, dragon-like form, Sonny is looked after by his mother, who has decided to poison herself and Sonny rather than have him be persecuted by humanity. Though Xorn tries to save them both, his attempts are stopped by a confused Sonny's rampage, ending with Sonny's death by police shooting. Xorn reflects on this experience as something far removed from his meditations in a Chinese prison.

Due to the rising violence and aggression against mutants worldwide, Charles Xavier founds the X-Corporation, a global organization meant to provide support to "civilian" mutant populations. The Paris branch, largely consisting of Banshee's X-Corps members, is dispatched to the Channel Tunnel after a train wreck possibly involving a "gene-hazard." Jean Grey and Professor Xavier meet to discuss Jean's recent manifestations of the Phoenix, but their conversation is interrupted by a group of paramilitary officers searching for Fantomex, the self-proclaimed "most notorious mutant criminal in Europe," who is hiding in the X-Corp offices and asking for the asylum promised by Xavier. Fantomex warns Xavier that his emergency response team in the tunnel is probably already dead, killed by something called Weapon XII.

Cyclops sits in a darkened room, discussing his doubts about his current relationship with Jean Grey. It is revealed that his confidante is teammate (and telepath) Emma Frost. Back at the X-Corp offices, Jean and Xavier use their abilities to stall the armed task force, while Fantomex calls on his "partner:" E.V.A., a biological craft resembling a flying saucer, and apparently Fantomex's external nervous system. Sneaking away to an undisclosed hideout, Fantomex reveals the true incident emerging in the tunnel. Weapon XII is the latest experiment in the Weapon Plus program, a human-sentinel hybrid developed in "the World," a time-accelerated laboratory manufacturing new ways to deal with the "mutant threat." Fantomex corrects the professor's mention of Wolverine as Weapon X: "...it's Weapon Ten, not Weapon X."

Despite feigning the intention to sell all information on Weapon XII to Xavier for one billion dollars, Fantomex eventually reveals his true intention is not to make money on the deal, but kill Weapon XII. After arriving at the entrance to the Channel Tunnel, Jean Grey is able to subdue the weapon, but only temporarily. Fantomex fights his way through the crowds of passengers that had been taken over by the viral mental control of Weapon XII, including X-Corp member Darkstar. Xavier asserts control of Multiple Man's bodies to oppose Weapon XII on equal mental footing. Upon finding the surviving passengers as well as the containers housing the weapon, Jean Grey discovers the truth behind Fantomex: he was never a European super-thief, but Weapon XIII gone rogue. Fantomex activates Weapon XII's off-switch, then convinces Jean Grey to let him flee to England.

As Darkstar is laid to rest, Archangel teaches a class of fliers, including Beak and Angel Salvadore. Beak wishes to journey along with the Xavier students travelling into space to help the Shi'ar relief efforts, but his self-consciousness is limiting his potential to fly (or so his teacher argues). With antagonist prodding from Angel, Beak leaps from the starting cliff...only to fall like a rock. Angel meets him on the ground, and rather than see him wallow in self-pity, grants him a passionate kiss to liven his spirits. Angel hauls Beak up to the spaceship in low-atmosphere orbit. While Beak is ecstatic enough to quit the space mission, Angel quietly collects winnings from her bet to kiss the ugliest member of the flying class. Elsewhere, Scott takes his private telepathy sessions with Emma Frost to a much more personal and physical level...

In the wreckage of Genosha, Unus the Untouchable is found huddled, shivering, gasping of "ghosts... millions of ghosts all buzzing... millions of voices... following her." Unus' descriptions lead the professor to believe Polaris is on the island, but other matters concern him. Several other life signatures have been found in ruins and with the giant remains of the wild sentinel morphing into a face of Magneto, the X-Men confront Toad and his followers as they construct a monument to their fallen leader. Eventually, Xavier and the X-Men find Polaris wandering naked, somehow conjuring electromagnetic "ghosts," revealed to be the last surviving thoughts of those killed on the island, preserved by Magneto to be put in an airplane flight recorder.

In Afghanistan, Wolverine busts up a mutant slave ring, only to bump into Fantomex, stealing rich people's names for blackmail. In response to Wolverine's disgust, Fantomex dangles the secrets of the Weapon Plus program in front of him, even using his birth name, "James." Before they are interrupted by reinforcements, Fantomex tells Wolverine the young Afghan girl unconscious in the tent is responsible for the slavers' deaths, not he. In Mumbai, India, Jean Grey stops an assassination on Professor Xavier after he averts a plane hijacking. Oddly enough, the marksman was none other than his lover and wife, Lilandra, who believed Cassandra Nova still possessed Xavier's body. After the professor leaves to deal with Shi'ar representatives, the rest of the X-Corps team meet Wolverine and Jean Grey at the Mumbai offices, as well as learning the rescued mutant refugee is Sooraya, a sand elemental.

The Shi'ar ship in orbit returns the Institute students preparing to travel into space, spokesman Araki 6 claiming that the troubles the X-Men bring wherever they go have caused the empire too much harm, and ties must be severed. Even Lilandra ends her relationship with Charles Xavier, and Araki mentions the Phoenix being a looming threat once again.

Major consequences
X-Corp is founded.
Fantomex and Dust are introduced.
Weapon X is retconned into the Weapon Plus Program
Darkstar is killed.
Professor Xavier's marriage to Lilandra is annulled.
Mutant Town, also known as District X, is introduced as a mutant ghetto in New York City. This would later become the setting for District X, a short-lived comic series.

Collected editions
The series has been collected into a trade paperback:

New Worlds (collects New X-Men #127-133)

As well as:

New X-Men Omnibus (collects New X-Men #114-154 and Annual 2001, 992 pages, December 2006 )
 New X-Men by Grant Morrison Ultimate Collection: Volume 2 (collects New X-Men #127-141, 360 pages, August 2008)

References

New X-Men story arcs